Mazdab (also Romanized as Mazdāb) is a village in Alghoorat Rural District, in the Central District of Birjand County, South Khorasan Province, Iran. It is located on the northern part of Birjand, between Birjand and Ghayen. The distance from Birjand is 75 km on the way passing from Arian Shahr and to Ghayen is 70 km. It is bordered to the southeast by Aso, to the west by Khong, to the north by Mahmooi, to the northeast by Gazar. At the 2006 census, its population was 548, in 150 households or more.

Agriculture in Mazdab 
Like most of the neighbor villages, the main agricultural product of Mazdab is Zereshk. It is exported mainly to Tehran and Mashhad. However, some other products like jujube, grape, pistachio, apricot, apple quince, pear, etc are produced in a limited volume and just for internal usage in some parts of the village.

Industry in Mazdab 
The main industry from old times is hand made carpet. There are also some working places for Zereshk packing. Moreover, there is also an industrial place for poultry making.

References 

Populated places in Birjand County